Jeremiah Murry Burrell (September 1, 1815 – October 1, 1856) was a lawyer and judge in western Pennsylvania, of whom three areas were named for.

In 1835, he started his career as a lawyer in the Westmoreland County seat of Greensburg, and around 1839 bought the rights to the newspaper, 
Pennsylvania Argus, which he used to promote his political views as editor. He was receiving national attention for his fiery debates by the early 1840s.

By 1844, he was debating for Presidential candidate James K. Polk. He further continued his political career as judge of the Tenth Judicial District of Pennsylvania in 1847 which he held until 1855 when he was appointed judge of the Territorial District of Kansas by President Franklin Pierce.

Burrell suffered from malaria, and returned to Greensburg in 1856. He later died of the sickness on October 1, 1856, aged 41.

Today, townships in Indiana County (Burrell), Armstrong County (Burrell), and Westmoreland County (Lower Burrell and Upper Burrell) bear his namesake.

References

1815 births
1856 deaths
American newspaper editors
American publishers (people)
Deaths from malaria
Pennsylvania lawyers
Pennsylvania Democrats
People from Murrysville, Pennsylvania
Indiana County, Pennsylvania
Infectious disease deaths in Pennsylvania
19th-century American journalists
American male journalists
19th-century American male writers
Journalists from Pennsylvania
19th-century American lawyers
19th-century American businesspeople